The ETTU Europe Trophy is the third most important continental tournament for clubs in European table tennis, after the European Champions League and the ETTU Cup. The European Table Tennis Union (ETTU) has organized this cup since the 2021–22 season for men and women teams. The ETTU Europe Trophy Grand Final will be host in Piraeus for the 2022–2023 season.

Results

Men's competition

Women's competition

See also
 European Table Tennis Union
 List of table tennis players

References

External links
 Official ETTU Website
 Official information of ETTU Europe Trophy

Table tennis competitions